Maxacteon is a genus of small predatory sea snails, marine gastropod molluscs in the family Acteonidae, the barrel bubble snails.

Species
Species within the genus Maxacteon include:
 Maxacteon cratericulatus Hedley, 1906
 Distribution : New Zealand
 Maxacteon flammeus (= Acteon flammeus) Gmelin, 1791
 Maxacteon hancocki (= Acteon hancocki) Rudman, 1971
 Distribution : New Zealand
 Length : 6 mm
 Description : headshield with a pair of fleshy lobes; thin operculum; white shell with orange-brown markings at the base and at the apex; large body whorl; large columella, slightly twisted; shell sculptured with grooves
 Maxacteon kawamurai (Habe, 1952)
 Maxacteon milleri (= Acteon milleri) Rudman, 1971
 Distribution : New Zealand
 Maxacteon sagamiensis (Kuroda & Habe, 1971)
Species brought into synonymy
 Maxacteon fabreanus (= Acteon fabreanus) Crosse, 1874: synonym of Punctacteon fabreanus (Crosse, 1874)

References
This article incorporates public domain text from the reference.

 The Sea Slug Forum : Maxacteon milleri
 Rudman, W.B. 1971. The family Acteonidae (Opisthobranchia: Gastropoda) in New Zealand. Journal of the Malacological Society of Australia 2: 205-214
 Valdés Á. (2008). Deep-sea "cephalaspidean" heterobranchs (Gastropoda) from the tropical southwest Pacific. Mémoires du Muséum National d'Histoire Naturelle 196:587-792

External links

Acteonidae